En människa is the debut studio album by Freda', released in 1984.

Track listing 
En människa
Secondhand shop
Inget ska få mig rädd
Om igen
Naken och rädd
Nu regnar det 
Kasperdockor
Piccolaflöjt
Ut i natten
Drick ur mitt glas
Mot all logik

Contributors 
Uno Svenningsson - vocals, guitar
Arne Johansson - guitar, song
Sam Johansson - keyboard, song
Per Nordbring - drums
Jan Nordbring - bass

References 

1984 debut albums
Freda' albums